Maggie Humm (born 1945) is an English feminist academic, Emeritus Professor of Cultural Studies at the University of East London. She has written on feminism and modernism, particularly the work of Virginia Woolf.

Life
Humm was educated at the University of East Anglia, graduating in 1966. She gained a Ph.D. from King's College London in 1980.

Humm's novel Talland House was chosen by the Washington Independent Review of Books as one of 51 'books of the year' for 2020.

Works
 An annotated critical bibliography of feminist criticism. Brighton: Harvester Press, 1984.
 Feminist criticism : women as contemporary critics. New York: St. Martin's Press, 1986.
 The dictionary of feminist theory. New York: Harvester Wheatsheaf, 1989.
 Border traffic: strategies of contemporary women writers . Manchester: Manchester University Press.
 (ed.) Modern feminisms: political, literary, cultural. New York: Columbia University Press, 1992.
 A reader's guide to contemporary feminist literary criticism. New York: Harvester Wheatsheaf, 1994.
 Practising feminist criticism : an introduction. New York: Harvester Wheatsheaf, 1995.
 Feminism and film. Bloomington: Indiana University Press, 1997.
 Modernist women and visual cultures : Virginia Woolf, Vanessa Bell, photography, and cinema. Edinburgh: Edinburgh University Press, 2002.
 Snapshots of Bloomsbury : the private lives of Virginia Woolf and Vanessa Bell. London: Tate, 2006.
 (ed.) The Edinburgh companion to Virginia Woolf and the arts.     Edinburgh: Edinburgh University Press, 2010.
 (ed. with Debra Benita Shaw) Radical space : exploring politics and practice. London: Rowman & Littlefield International, 2015.
 Talland House: a novel. Berkeley, CA : She Writes Press, 2020.

References

External links
 Website

1945 births
Living people
English feminist writers
English literary critics
English novelists
Alumni of the University of East Anglia
Alumni of King's College London
Academics of the University of East London